The Sporting News NFL Executive of the Year Award was originally established in 1955. It is given annually to one executive - including general managers - in the National Football League. 

The Sporting News first published their NFL Executive of the Year awards in 1955 & 1956, but it was discontinued. However, at the end of the 1972 NFL season, the Sporting News revived the award and has been given out almost every year since. The only exception since the revival was 2013, when no NFL executive was picked. The award itself recognizes the efforts of an executive who's done good work in assembling and building a winning NFL team, especially if the team either reached or won the Super Bowl.

Key

Award Winners

See also
 List of National Football League awards

References

National Football League trophies and awards
Awards established in 1955